Route 143 is a  state highway in Camden County, New Jersey, United States. It is a short route in Winslow Township, Camden County, running along Spring Garden Road between Cedarbrook Road and White Horse Pike (U.S. Route 30 or US 30). The route's southern terminus is at an intersection with County Route 561 (CR 561) and Camden County Route 726 in Winslow Township. The route heads along the old alignment of New Jersey Route 43, intersecting with U.S. Route 30 and ending a short distance afterward, where it continues as Camden County Route 716.

The use of this route number reflects the former designation of the White Horse Pike as Route 43. Route 43 itself, dates back to the original state highway system in New Jersey, which it was designated as State Highway Route 3. The route was renumbered 43 in the 1927 state highway renumbering, using most of U.S. Route 30 for its alignment. The route remained intact until 1953, when another renumbering occurred, decommissioning Route 43 entirely. The highway was revived in a short portion in 1955, receiving a designation in 1989.

Route description

Route 143 begins at CR 561 and CR 726 in Winslow Township. Known as Spring Garden Road, it proceeds north-northeast through wooded residential areas. The route crosses Conrail Shared Assets Operations' Beesleys Point Secondary railroad line before intersecting Woodland Drive.  From this point, the road passes to the east of the Ancora Psychiatric Hospital and intersects Center Drive before coming to Lake Drive. Following this intersection, it passes between several small sized lakes within heavily forested areas before heading through some farm fields. Here, the road intersects CR 721 (East Central Avenue). A short distance later, Route 143 crosses US 30 and continues for a little bit to the end of state maintenance. At this point, the road becomes CR 716 and continues north.

History

The earliest possible evidence of state maintenance of Spring Garden Road came in 1955, when a portion of highway called Route 43 was contracted to be rebuilt north of a crossing with the Pennsylvania Railroad as Section 11E of the highway. However, no maps from then up to its designation as Route 143 in 1989 showed the highway being under state maintenance; in 1965, the road was shown to be designated as an extension of County Route 726. Two explanations have been proposed for this discrepancy: either the highway referred to was US 30, which had been designated NJ 43 until 1953, or the highway was reverted to local maintenance soon after its reconstruction. The route received its designation of Route 143 on June 14, 1989 when the State Legislature approved the new designation.

Major intersections

See also

References

External links 

 http://www.alpsroads.net/roads/nj/nj_143/ New Jersey Roads: Route 143]
 http://www.njroads.org/ends/143/nj143.htm New Jersey Highway Ends: 143]
 http://www.state.nj.us/transportation/refdata/traffic_orders/speed/rt143.shtm Speed Limits for State Roads: Route 143]

143
Transportation in Camden County, New Jersey